O'Bryant may refer to:

Hugh O'Bryant (1813–1883), the first mayor of Portland, Oregon, United States, serving from 1851–1852
Jimmy O'Bryant (1896–1928), American jazz clarinetist, often compared to Johnny Dodds
John D. O'Bryant (1931–1992), the first African American to be elected to Boston's School Committee in 1977
Johnny O'Bryant III (born 1993), American professional basketball player for Crvena Zvezda of the Adriatic League and the EuroLeague
Patrick O'Bryant (born 1986), US-born Central African professional basketball player for the London Lightning of the National Basketball League of Canada

See also
John D. O'Bryant School of Mathematics and science, formerly known as Boston Technical High School
O'Bryant Square, in downtown Portland, Oregon, United States
W.E. O'Bryant Bell Tower, University of Arkansas at Pine Bluff, Arkansas, United States
Brant (disambiguation)
Bryan (disambiguation)
Bryant (disambiguation)
O'Bryan
O'Brian
List of people named O'Brien